The Timorese Malaysians or Florenese Malaysians consists of people of full or partial Timorese descent who were born in or immigrated to Malaysia. Timorese in Malaysia consist mainly of Timorese formerly resident in Indonesian West Timor as well as recent migrants from East Timor. Most of the Timorese arrived following the occupation of East Timor by Indonesia. Most of these Timorese reside in the state of Sabah especially on the east coast area of Tawau Division with some of them intermarried with the local peoples.

Relations between the state of Sabah and East Timor 
Since the independence of East Timor from Indonesia, the first President of East Timor Xanana Gusmão has paid a visit to the state of Sabah on a working visit and to see the Timorese communities there.

See also
 East Timor–Malaysia relations

References

Further reading
 
 

Timorese
East Timorese diaspora
East Timor–Malaysia relations
 
Immigration to Malaysia